Sloan is an unincorporated community in San Saba County, in the U.S. state of Texas. According to the Handbook of Texas, the community had a population of 30 in 2000.

History
Dr. Thomas Alan Sloan and his family settled here in the mid-1850s. The community itself was established that next decade when Archibald J. Rose established the first church and established a sawmill and gristmill. It was originally known as Rock Shoals. Its name was changed to Sloan in 1894. A post office was established that year and remained in operation until 1904. James A. Sloan served as the postmaster. 131 people were living here in the 1890s, most of whom were farmers, but it then began to decline soon after. The New Hope Presbyterian Church also served as a community center and was built in 1951. It was also home to a ditch that was an earthen and stone irrigation canal system in 1880 and was still in use a century later. Its population was 30 in 2000.

Geography

Climate
The climate in this area is characterized by hot, humid summers and generally mild to cool winters. According to the Köppen Climate Classification system, Sloan has a humid subtropical climate, abbreviated "Cfa" on climate maps.

Education
Archibald J. Rose established a school here, which joined the San Saba Independent School District in 1955.

References

Unincorporated communities in San Saba County, Texas
Unincorporated communities in Texas